If It Bleeds is a collection of four previously unpublished novellas by American writer Stephen King. The stories in the collection are titled "Mr. Harrigan's Phone", "The Life of Chuck", "If It Bleeds", and "Rat". It was released on April 28, 2020.

The audiobook is read by Will Patton, Danny Burstein, and Steven Weber.

Contents
The four novellas contained in the collection are:

Mr. Harrigan's Phone
Craig gets a job working for the retired Mr. Harrigan, who gifts Craig a winning lottery ticket. Craig then buys Mr. Harrigan a cell phone using some of the money won from the lottery ticket. Eventually, Mr. Harrigan dies and later, Craig leaves a voicemail on Mr. Harrigan's old phone about a bully. The bully is later found to have died by suicide. Craig then decides not to use the phone with Mr. Harrigan's number and switches to a newer model. Later, after the drunk driver responsible for a loved teacher's death receives a light sentence, Craig calls Mr. Harrigan's phone and leaves a voicemail about the drunk driver using his old phone. The drunk driver is then found to have died by suicide; following this, Craig throws his old phone into a lake.

The Life of Chuck
The story is split into three acts given in reverse chronological order. They are given in chronological order here:

 In Act 1: 'I Contain Multitudes', Chuck is orphaned and is brought up by his paternal grandparents, where his love of dancing develops. His grandparents always keep their house's cupola locked, but eventually Chuck unlocks the room and sees himself dying of a brain tumor at the age of 39.
 In Act 2: 'Buskers', Chuck sees a drummer busking and starts dancing. A young girl joins him, dancing with Chuck as a crowd surrounds them. After dancing, Chuck suffers a bad headache and walks away dejected.
 In Act 3: 'Thanks, Chuck', Marty drives home and sees a billboard showing an accountant sitting at a desk, underneath it says ’39 Great Years! Thanks, Chuck’ as the world appears to be slowly crumbling. That evening as Marty visits his ex-wife Felicia he notices Chuck's image appearing everywhere.  In a hospital, Chuck is dying surrounded by his family. Marty and Felicia see the stars disappearing, then blackness.

If It Bleeds
Holly Gibney of the Finders Keepers detective agency sees footage of a horrific school bombing on TV. She suspects that there is something odd about the reporter Ondowsky who was first on the scene and that he may be a supernatural 'outsider'. Holly makes contact with an elderly former policeman who believes that the reporter feeds on the fear of traumatic emotions, and Holly realises that Ondowsky must be stopped. She, Barbara, and Jerome must all work together to take down Ondowsky.

Gibney is one of King's recurring characters, having appeared in his Bill Hodges trilogy (Mr. Mercedes, Finders Keepers and End of Watch), and in The Outsider.

Rat
Writer and academic Drew Larson has published several short stories but has been unable to complete a novel.  Then he has the inspiration to write a Western thriller and is determined to complete it. He sets out for an old isolated family cabin and begins to write, but bad weather and sickness set in. Drew strikes a sinister bargain with a rat; it offers to get rid of his writer's block in exchange for the death of one of Larson's loved ones. Thinking that his imagination is getting the best of him, he agrees and goes about his day. Finally, when the storm clears Larson returns home to his family. The novel is successful, his friend recovers from a previous illness but is then killed with his wife in an automobile accident.

Reception
USA Todays Brian Truitt awarded the collection three and a quarter of four, saying, "King still owns the fright business like none other, but the iconic author will keep you up late at night engrossed in four tales about our dreams and our frailties."

Publishers Weekly said of the release, "The four never-before-published novellas in this collection represent horror master King at his finest, using the weird and uncanny to riff on mortality, the price of creativity, and the unpredictable consequences of material attachments."

Kirkus Reviews summed up the release as "Vintage King: a pleasure for his many fans and not a bad place to start if you're new to him."

Film adaptations

Mr. Harrigan's Phone

On July 10, 2020, Deadline Hollywood reported that Netflix had acquired the film rights to Mr. Harrigan's Phone, produced by Blumhouse Productions and Ryan Murphy. It premiered on October 5, 2022.

Others
"Rat" was optioned by Ben Stiller, who intends to produce, star and direct. Darren Aronofsky's Protozoa Pictures has optioned "The Life of Chuck", with Aronofsky to produce. If It Bleeds could be acquired by HBO, due to their use of the Gibney character in The Outsider.

References

External links 
 

2020 short story collections
American short story collections
Short story collections by Stephen King
Charles Scribner's Sons books